The Deobandi movement or Deobandism is a revivalist movement within Sunni Islam that adheres to the Hanafi school of law. It formed in the late 19th century around the Darul Uloom Madrassa in Deoband, India, from which the name derives, by Muhammad Qasim Nanautavi, Rashid Ahmad Gangohi, and several others, after the Indian Rebellion of 1857–58. The movement pioneered education in religious sciences through the Dars-i-Nizami associated with the Lucknow-based ulema of Firangi Mahal with the goal of preserving traditional Islamic teachings from the influx of modernist, secular ideas during British colonial rule. The Deobandi movement's Indian clerical wing, Jamiat Ulema-e-Hind, was founded in 1919 and played a major role in the Indian independence movement through its participation in the Pan-Islamist Khalifat movement and propagation of the doctrine of composite nationalism.

Theologically, the Deobandis uphold the doctrine of taqlid (conformity to legal precedent) and adhere to the Hanafi school. Founders of the Deobandi school Nanautavi and Gangohi drew inspiration from the religio-political doctrines of the prominent South Asian Islamic scholar and Sufi reformer Shah Waliullah Dehlawi (1703–1762 CE / 1114–1175 AH). In its early years, Deobandi ulema engaged in theological debates with Christian and Hindu scholars; with the objective of defending Islamic faith, and to form a popular struggle to overthrow British colonialism. Deobandi theologians of Jamiat Ulema e-Hind, in particular, discussed multiculturalism and opposition to the partition of India, with a strategic vision to safeguard the religious freedom of Muslims in India.

In response to the Soviet invasion of Afghanistan in 1979, Saudi Arabia decided to support the Deobandi movement due to its popularity in the Pashtun regions in Afghanistan and Pakistan, which influenced the movement with Salafi ideals. From the early 1980s to the early 2000s, Deobandis were robustly funded by Saudi Arabia. Pakistan also strongly supported Deobandi Mujahidin to fight the Soviet Union in Afghanistan and India in the Kashmir insurgency, owing to their affiliation with the Pan-Islamist legacies of Shah Waliullah and the Silk Letter Movement in the subcontinent. Alongside Jamaat-e-Islami, Deobandi Islamist militias constituted the most committed volunteers for the anti-communist Afghan Jihad.

The movement has spread from India, Pakistan, Afghanistan and Bangladesh to the United Kingdom, and has a presence in South Africa. The Pakistani and Afghan branches and the original Indian seminaries have far less contact since the Partition of India, for political reasons related to the India–Pakistan border. Followers of the Deobandi movement are extremely diverse; some advocate for non-violence and others are militant.

Foundation and expansion
British colonialism in India was seen by a group of Indian scholars—consisting of Rashid Ahmad Gangohi, Muhammad Yaqub Nanautawi, Shah Rafi al-Din, Sayyid Muhammad Abid, Zulfiqar Ali, Fazlur Rahman Usmani and Muhammad Qasim Nanotvi—to be corrupting Islam. The group founded an Islamic seminary (madrassa) known as Darul Uloom Deoband, where the Islamic revivalist and anti-imperialist ideology of the Deobandis began to develop. In time, the Darul Uloom Deoband became the second largest focal point of Islamic teaching and research after the Al-Azhar University, Cairo. Towards the time of the Indian independence movement and afterward in post-colonial India, the Deobandis advocated a notion of composite nationalism by which Hindus and Muslims were seen as one nation who were asked to be united in the struggle against the British rule.

In 1919, a large group of Deobandi scholars formed the political party Jamiat Ulema-e-Hind and opposed the partition of India. Deobandi scholar Maulana Syed Husain Ahmad Madani helped to spread these ideas through his text Muttahida Qaumiyat Aur Islam. A group later dissented from this position and joined Muhammad Ali Jinnah's Muslim League, including Ashraf Ali Thanwi, Shabbir Ahmad Usmani, Zafar Ahmad Usmani and Muhammad Shafi Deobandi, who formed the Jamiat Ulema-e-Islam in 1945.

Through the organisations such as Jamiat Ulema-e-Hind and Tablighi Jamaat, the Deobandi movement began to spread. Graduates of Darul Uloom Deoband in India from countries such as South Africa, China, and Malaysia opened thousands of madaaris throughout the world.

India

The Deobandi Movement in India is controlled by the Darul Uloom Deoband and the Jamiat Ulema-e-Hind.

Pakistan

Of Pakistan's estimated 230 million Muslims, some 15-30% or 40-80 million Pakistani Muslims consider themselves Deobandi, forming majority in Khyber Pakhtunkhwa and Balochistan. It is the most followed Movement among Pashtuns and Balochs According to Heritage Online, nearly 65% of the total seminaries (Madrasah) in Pakistan are run by Deobandis, whereas 25% are run by Barelvis, 6% by Ahl-i Hadith and 3% by various Shia organizations. The Deobandi movement in Pakistan was a major recipient of funding from Saudi Arabia from the early 1980s up until the early 2000s, whereafter this funding was diverted to the rival Ahl-i Hadith movement. Having seen Deoband as a counterbalance to Iranian influence in the region, Saudi funding is now strictly reserved for the Ahl-i Hadith.

Deobandi-affiliated groups such as the TTP, SSP, Let, etc. have a militant character and have attacked and destroyed Sufi sites holy to Sunni Muslims of the Barelvi movement, such as Data Darbar in Lahore, Abdullah Shah Ghazi's tomb in Karachi, Khal Magasi in Balochistan, and Rahman Baba's tomb in Peshawar.

Bangladesh

As with the rest of the Indian subcontinent, the majority of Muslims in Bangladesh are traditional Sunni, who mainly follow the Hanafi school of jurisprudence (madh'hab) and consequently the Maturidi school of theology. The majority of them are Deobandi along with Tablighi (51%)  or 80 Million Muslims; the Deobandi, in the form of Qawmi institutions, own the vast majority of private Islamic seminaries and produce the majority of the ulema in Bangladesh. Among Sunnis who are not traditional Hanafi, the Salafi-influenced Ahle Hadith and the Jamaat e Islami (19%) have a substantial following.

Afghanistan
Deobandi Islam is the most popular form of pedagogy in the Pashtun belt on both sides of the Durand Line that separates Afghanistan and Pakistan. Moreover, prominent Afghan and Pakistani Taliban leaders have studied in Deobandi seminaries.

South Africa 

The Deobandi Movement has an international presence today, with its full-fledged manifestation in South Africa, a country where the movement was initiated through the Indian Gujarati merchant class. The Islamic education system of the Deobandi movement, as well as the necessary components of social and political organizations such as Tablighi Jamaat, Sufism and Jamiat, are fully functioning effectively in South Africa, as they do in India. Madrasas in South Africa provide Islamic higher education and are now centers for Islamic education for foreigners who are interested in receiving a Deobandi-style education. Many of their graduates, especially from Western countries such as the United Kingdom and the United States, are Western students. Some of South African madrasas are recognized globally, providing fatwa services. South Africa is now known for producing exceptional Islamic literature through translation and compilation. Similarly, the Tabligh Jamaat is a hub in South Africa that spreads throughout South and East Africa. Graduates of South African madrassas spend their time in the path of the Tabligh Jamaat. Through the work of several spiritual personalities of the Deobandis, the tradition of Deoband's Tasawwuf (Sufism) has taken root in South Africa. Among them are Muhammad Zakariyya al-Kandhlawi, Masihullah Khan, Mahmood Hasan Gangohi and Asad Madni. South African Deobandi Muslims have many important and influential educational and socio-political organizations that educate the people and play an important role in religious and social activities. Among them are Jamiatul Ulama South Africa and the Muslim Judicial Council.

Iran 

Students from various regions, including Sistan and Baluchestan in Iran, attended Deoband, which led to the spread of its founders ideas. This movement had a significant impact on some of the new generation of Iranian intellectuals in the late 19th and early 20th centuries. After entering Iran, the students of this school continued to expand this thinking and with the formation of missionary groups. These thoughts have been strengthened on one hand due to the cultural relationships between the Baloch tribes and on the other hand due to the connection of Sistan and Baluchestan's Iran and India's Hanafi religious leaders in Iran. Today, Deobandi thinking is one of the intellectual currents in Sistan and Baluchestan and preaching groups are active in different cities and villages. Its playing a crucial role in Iran's political landscape. The Deobandis aimed to homogenize religious schools and were opposed to certain popular practices. The Naqshbandi order played an important role in the Deobandi school of thought in the Persian-speaking world.

United Kingdom

In the 1970s, Deobandis opened the first British-based Muslim religious seminaries (Darul-Ulooms), educating imams and religious scholars. Deobandis "have been quietly meeting the religious and spiritual needs of a significant proportion of British Muslims, and are perhaps the most influential British Muslim group." In 2015 Ofsted highlighted the Deobandi seminary in Holcombe as a good example of a school "promoting British values, preventing radicalisation and protecting children". The journalist, Andrew Norfolk, did not agree with this assessment.

According to a 2007 report by Andrew Norfolk, published in The Times, about 600 of Britain's nearly 1,500 mosques were under the control of "a hardline sect", whose leading preacher loathed Western values, called on Muslims to "shed blood" for Allah and preached contempt for Jews, Christians and Hindus. The same investigative report further said that 17 of the country's 26 Islamic seminaries follow the ultra-conservative Deobandi teachings which The Times said had given birth to the Taliban. According to The Times, almost 80% of all domestically trained Ulema were being trained in these hardline seminaries. An opinion column in The Guardian described this report as "a toxic mixture of fact, exaggeration and outright nonsense".

In 2014 it was reported that 45 per cent of Britain's mosques and nearly all the UK-based training of Islamic scholars are controlled by the Deobandi, the largest single Islamic group.

Most Muslim prison chaplaincies in Britain are Deobandi, and in 2016 Michael Spurr (chief executive of the National Offender Management Service) wrote to Britain's prison governors bringing to their attention that Ofsted had said that "the UK’s most influential Deobandi seminary promotes 'fundamental British values such as democracy, individual liberty and mutual respect and tolerance for those of different faiths'."

Beliefs
The Deobandi movement sees itself as a scholastic tradition that grew out of the Islamic scholastic traditions of Medieval Transoxania and Mughal India, and it considers its visionary forefather to be Shah Waliullah Dehlawi (1703-1762). Dehlawi was a contemporary of Muhammad ibn Abd al-Wahhab (1703 - 1792), and they studied in Medina under some of the same teachers, despite having different theological backgrounds.

Theology

In tenets of faith, the Deobandis follow the Maturidi school of Islamic theology.
Their schools teach a short text on beliefs known as al-'Aqa'id al-Nasafiyya by the Hanafi-Maturidi scholar Najm al-Din 'Umar al-Nasafi.

The official Deobandi book, al-Muhannad 'ala al-Mufannad (The Sword on the Disproved), also known as: al-Tasdiqat li-Daf' al-Talbisat (Endorsements Repelling Deceits), is a work that summarizes the beliefs generally held by the Deobandis. It was authored by Khalil Ahmad al-Saharanpuri (d. 1346/1927) in order to defend and vindicate the Deobandis from the charge of kufr (unbelief or blasphemy) levied against them by their opponents.

Fiqh (Islamic law)

Deobandis are strong proponents of the doctrine of Taqlid. In other words, they believe that a Deobandi must adhere to one of the four schools (madhhabs) of Sunni Islamic Law and generally discourage inter-school eclecticism. They themselves claims the followers of the Hanafi school. Students at madrasas affiliated with the Deobandi movement study the classic books of Hanafi Law such as Nur al-Idah, Mukhtasar al-Quduri, Sharh al-Wiqayah, and Kanz al-Daqa’iq, culminating their study of the madhhab with the Hidayah of al-Marghinani.

With regard to views on Taqlid, one of their main opposing reformist groups are the Ahl-i-Hadith, also known as the Ghair Muqallid, the nonconformists, because they eschewed taqlid in favor of the direct use of Quran and Hadith. They often accuse those who adhere to the rulings of one scholar or legal school of blind imitation, and frequently demand scriptural evidence for every argument and legal ruling. Almost since the very beginnings of the movement, Deobandi scholars have generated a copious amount of scholarly output in an attempt to defend their adherence to a madhhab in general. In particular, Deobandis have penned much literature in defense of their argument that the Hanafi madhhab is in complete accordance with the Quran and Hadith.

Hadith 

In response to this need to defend their madhhab in the light of scripture, Deobandis became particularly distinguished for their unprecedented salience to the study of Hadith in their madrasas. Their madrasa curriculum incorporates a feature unique among the global arena of Islamic scholarship, the Daura-e Hadis, the capstone year of a student's advanced madrasa training, in which all six canonical collections of the Sunni Hadith (the Sihah Sittah) are reviewed.

In a Deobandi madrasa, the position of Shaykh al-Hadith, or the resident professor of Sahih Bukhari, is held in much reverence. Their views were widely shared by a broad range of Islamic reform movements of the colonial period.

Sufism and Wahhabism

Deobandis have a complex history with Sufism. They generally oppose traditional Sufi practices such as celebrating the birthday of the Islamic prophet Muhammad and seeking help from him, the celebration of Urs, pilgrimage to the shrines of Sufi saints, practice of Sema, and loud dhikr - seeing them as too esoteric in nature. However many Deobandi leaders incorporate elements of Sufism into their practices. Deoband's curriculum combined the study of Islamic holy scriptures (Quran, hadith and law) with rational subjects (logic, philosophy and science). At the same time it was hugely Sufi in orientation and affiliated with the Chisti order. Taqi Usmani - the most famous Deobandi scholar was trained in the Chishti order. Mahmood Ashraf Usmani, the former head of Darul Ulum Karachi, defended the concept of tariqas and bayah based on the Pledge of the Tree incident. Ashraf Ali Thanwi graduated from Darul Ulum Deoband and was widely considered the preeminent Sufi of modern India. Deobandis generally oppose the various forms of Tawassul and Istighatha but see the matter mainly as fiqh in nature, not aqeedah.

Founders of the Deobandi school, Muhammad Qasim Nanautavi and Rashid Ahmad Gangohi, were inspired by the Sufi-religio-political doctrine of Shah Waliullah but also by Wahhabi ideology, amongst other sources of inspiration. Gangohi studied under the Sufi shaykh Haji Imdadullah Muhajir Makki, although he differed with his views in many ways. Gangohi's Fatawa-yi Rashidiyya opposed traditional Sufi practices such as loud dhikr, visiting the tombs of Sufi saints, celebrating Urs, visualizing or contemplating on a Sufi master (tasawwur-e-shaykh), reciting the Fatihah on special occasions, and engaging in Sema.

Muhammad Zakariyya Kandhlawi, noted hadith scholar and Sufi Shaykh of Deobandis, says that,

Positions
According to Brannon D. Ingram, Deobandis differ from Barelvis on three theological positions. Gangohi stated that God has the ability to lie. This doctrine is called Imkan-i Kizb. According to this doctrine, because God is omnipotent, God is capable of lying. Gangohi also supported the doctrine that God has the ability to make additional prophets after Muhammad (Imkan-i Nazir) and other prophets equal to Muhammad. Gangohi clarifies that although God has the ability to make prophets on "par" with Muhammad, he "would never do so". This goes against traditional Sufi beliefs which see Prophet Muhammad as the apex of creation. Gangohi opposed the Sufi doctrine that Muhammad has knowledge of the unseen (ilm e ghaib). This belief of the Deobandis conflicts with traditional Sufi views of Muhammad having unparalleled and unequal knowledge that encompasses the unseen realm. Gangohi also issued multiple fatwas against the Mawlid and stated it is an innovation (bidah), opposed the practice of standing up in honour of Muhammad during Mawlid.

Scholarship

Deobandi fiqh 

Deobandi fiqh, originating from the Hanafi school of Islamic law, is a distinctive school of Islamic jurisprudence that highly values the strict adherence to the Hanafi school of jurisprudence, also known as Taqlid. Deobandi scholars view Taqlid as a crucial means of ensuring the proper interpretation and application of Islamic law, especially for individuals without the necessary knowledge and expertise to engage in Ijtihad. However, Ijtihad is also recognized as necessary for the evolution of Islamic law, but it should be approached with caution and respect for Islamic scholarship traditions. Darul Uloom Deoband established the first Department of Fatwa, or Darul Ifta, in 1892, followed by other Deobandi madrasas and organizations such as the Islamic Fiqh Academy (India), which constitute the bedrock for the development of the Deobandi fiqh. Rashid Ahmad Gangohi is considered the founder of Deobandi fiqh, with Ashraf Ali Thanwi and Aziz-ul-Rahman Usmani regarded as key figures. The earliest text of Deobandi fiqh is Fatawa-e-Rashidiya, with other important texts including Imdad-ul-Fatawa and Fatawa Darul Uloom Deoband. Deobandi fiqh plays a vital role in Afghanistan's judiciary system, with Taqi Usmani and Khalid Saifullah Rahmani recognized as prominent contemporary faqihs of the Deobandi school. Digital initiatives such as Darulifta-Deoband.com and Askimam demonstrate the digitization of Deobandi fiqh. A significant fatwa in Deobandi fiqh is the Fatwa of Peace for Humanity, issued by Farid Uddin Masood in 2016, endorsed by over 100,000 Islamic scholars from Bangladesh, declaring terrorism as haram or forbidden, based on Islamic scripture and tradition.

Deobandi hadith studies

Politics

Deobandi jihadism 

Deobandi jihadism pertains to a militant interpretation of Islam that draws upon the teachings of the Deobandi movement. The Deobandi movement underwent three waves of armed conflict. The first wave resulted in the establishment of an Islamic territory centered on Thana Bhawan by the movement's elders during the Indian Rebellion of 1857, prior to the founding of Darul Uloom Deoband. Imdadullah Muhajir Makki served as the Amir al-Mu'minin of this Islamic territory, Rashid Ahmad Gangohi as the Chief justice, and Muhammad Qasim Nanautavi as the Commander-in-chief. However, following the British victory over the Deobandi forces in the Battle of Shamli, the territory fell. After the establishment of Darul Uloom Deoband, Mahmud Hasan Deobandi initiated the second wave. He attempted to mobilize an armed resistance against the British through various initiatives, including the formation of the Samratut Tarbiat. When the British uncovered his Silk Letter Movement, they arrested him and held him captive in Malta. Following his release, he and his followers entered mainstream politics and actively participated in the democratic process. In the late 1970s, the Pakistan–Afghan border became the epicenter of the Deobandi jihadist movement's third wave, which was fueled by the Soviet–Afghan War. Under the auspices of President Zia-ul-Haq, its expansion occurred through various madrasas, such as Darul Uloom Haqqania and Jamia Uloom-ul-Islamia, with political support provided by Jamiat Ulema-e-Islam (S). Trained militants from the Pakistan–Afghan border participated in the Afghan jihad and later formed various organizations, including the Taliban. The most prominent example of Deobandi jihadism is the Taliban, who established Islamic rule in Afghanistan. Sami-ul-Haq, the head of Jamiat Ulema-e-Islam (S), is regarded as the "father of the Taliban."

Organizations

Jamiat Ulema-I-Hind

Jamiat Ulema-e-Hind is one of the leading Deobandi organizations in India. It was founded in British India in 1919 by Ahmad Saeed Dehlavi, Sanaullah Amritsari and several other scholars including Kifayatullah Dehlawi who was elected its first president. The Jamiat has propounded a theological basis for its nationalistic philosophy. Their thesis is that Muslims and non-Muslims have entered upon a mutual contract in India since independence, to establish a secular state. The Constitution of India represents this contract.

Jamiat Ulema-e-Islam
Jamiat Ulema-e-Islam (JUI) is a Deobandi organization, part of the Deobandi movement. The JUI formed when members broke from the Jamiat Ulema-e-Hind in 1945 after that organization backed the Indian National Congress against the Muslim League's lobby for a separate Pakistan. The first president of the JUI was Shabbir Ahmad Usmani.

Majlis-e-Ahrar-e-Islam
Majlis-e-Ahrar-e-Islam, also known in short as Ahrar, was a conservative Deobandi political party in the Indian subcontinent during the British Raj (prior to the independence of Pakistan) founded 29 December 1929 at Lahore. Chaudhry Afzal Haq, Syed Ata Ullah Shah Bukhari, Habib-ur-Rehman Ludhianvi, Mazhar Ali Azhar, Zafar Ali Khan and Dawood Ghaznavi were the founders of the party. The Ahrar was composed of Indian Muslims disillusioned by the Khilafat Movement, which cleaved closer to the Congress Party. The party was associated with opposition to Muhammad Ali Jinnah and against establishment of an independent Pakistan as well as criticism of the Ahmadiyya movement. After the independence of Pakistan in 1947, Majlis-e-Ahrar divided in two parts. Now, Majlis-e-Ahrar-e-Islam is working for the sake of Muhammad, nifaaz Hakomat-e-illahiyya and Khidmat-e-Khalq. In Pakistan, Ahrar secretariat is in Lahore and in India it is based in Ludhiana.

Tablighi Jamaat 
Tablighi Jamaat, a non-political Deobandi missionary organisation, began as an offshoot of the Deobandi movement. Its inception is believed to be a response to Hindu reform movements, which were considered a threat to vulnerable and non-practising Deobandi Muslims. It gradually expanded from a local to a national organisation, and finally to a transnational movement with followers in over 200 countries. Although its beginnings were from the Deobandi movement, it has now established an independent identity though it still maintains close ties with Deobandi ulema in many countries with large South Asian Muslim populations such as the UK.

Associated political organizations
 Jamiat Ulema-e-Hind
 Jamiat Ulema-e-Islam
 Majlis-e-Ahrar-ul-Islam
 Sipah-e-Sahaba Pakistan
 Hefazat-e-Islam Bangladesh

Associated militant organizations

Lashkar-e-Jhangvi
Lashkar-e-Jhangvi (LJ) (Army of Jhangvi) was a Deobandi militant organization. Formed in 1996, it operated in Pakistan as an offshoot of Sipah-e-Sahaba (SSP). Riaz Basra broke away from the SSP over differences with his seniors. The group, now practically defunct since the unsuccessful Operation Zarb-e-Azab, is considered a terrorist group by Pakistan and the United States, It was involved in attacks on civilians and protectors of them. Lashkar-e-Jhangvi is predominantly Punjabi. The group has been labelled by intelligence officials in Pakistan as a major security threat.

Taliban
The Taliban ("students"), alternative spelling Taleban, is an Islamic fundamentalist political and militant movement in Afghanistan. It spread into Afghanistan and formed a government, ruling as the Islamic Emirate of Afghanistan from September 1996 until December 2001, with Kandahar as the capital.
While in power, it enforced its strict interpretation of Sharia law. While many leading Muslims and Islamic scholars have been highly critical of the Taliban's interpretations of Islamic law, the Darul Uloom Deoband has consistently supported the Taliban in Afghanistan, including their 2001 destruction of the Buddhas of Bamiyan, and the majority of the Taliban's leaders were influenced by Deobandi fundamentalism. Pashtunwali, the Pashtun tribal code, also played a significant role in the Taliban's legislation. The Taliban were condemned internationally for their brutal treatment of women.

Tehrik-i-Taliban Pakistan
Tehrik-i-Taliban Pakistan (the TTP), alternatively referred to as the Pakistani Taliban, is an umbrella organization of various Islamist militant groups based in the northwestern Federally Administered Tribal Areas along the Afghan border in Pakistan. In December 2007 about 13 groups united under the leadership of Baitullah Mehsud to form the Tehrik-i-Taliban Pakistan. Among the Tehrik-i-Taliban Pakistan's stated objectives are resistance against the Pakistani state, enforcement of their interpretation of sharia and a plan to unite against NATO-led forces in Afghanistan.

The TTP is not directly affiliated with the Afghan Taliban movement led by Mullah Omar, with both groups differing greatly in their histories, strategic goals and interests although they both share a primarily Deobandi interpretation of Islam and are predominantly Pashtun.

Sipah-e-Sahaba
Sipah-e-Sahaba Pakistan (SSP) is a banned Pakistani militant organization, and a formerly registered Pakistani political party. Established in the early 1980s in Jhang by the militant leader Haq Nawaz Jhangvi, its stated goal is primarily to deter major Shiite influence in Pakistan in the wake of the Iranian Revolution. The organization was banned by President Pervez Musharraf in 2002 as being a terrorist group under the Anti-Terrorism Act of 1997.
In October 2000 Masood Azhar, another militant leader, and founder of Jaish-e-Mohammed (JeM), was quoted as saying that "Sipah-e-Sahaba stands shoulder to shoulder with Jaish-e-Muhammad in Jehad." A leaked U.S. diplomatic cable described JeM as "another SSP breakaway Deobandi organization."

Notable institutions

Right after Darul Uloom Deoband, the main center of Deobandism throughout the world, Mazahir Uloom, Saharanpur is the second known Deobandi madrassa in India, which produced the scholars like Muhammad Zakariyya Kandhlawi. Muhammad Qasim Nanautavi's established Madrasa Shahi, Moradabad, the alma of scholars like Mufti Mahmud and Saeed Ahmad Akbarabadi has its position. Darul Uloom Karachi, founded by Mufti Shafi Usmani, Jamia Binoria and Jamia Uloom-ul-Islamia in Pakistani are top Deobandi institutions there. Darul Uloom Bury, Holcombe, established by Yusuf Motala during 1970s is the first Deobandi madrassa of the West In South Africa, Darul Ulum Newcastle, was founded in 1971 by Cassim Mohammed Sema and Dar al-Ulum Zakariyya in Lenasia, Madrasah In'aamiyyah, Camperdown is known for its Dar al-Iftaa (Department of Fatwa Research and Training) which runs the popular online fatwa service, Askimam.org. Al-Jamiatul Ahlia Darul Ulum Moinul Islam is the first established Deobandi madrassa in Bangladesh, which produced the scholars like Shah Ahmad Shafi, Junaid Babunagari. Al-Rashid Islamic Institute, Ontario, Canada, Darul Uloom Al-Madania in Buffalo, New York, Jamiah Darul Uloom Zahedan in Iran and Darul Uloom Raheemiyyah are some top Deobandi institutions.

Scholars

 Mahmud Deobandi (died 1886) – First teacher of Darul Uloom Deoband.
 Mahmud Hasan Deobandi (1851–1920) – Popularly known as "Shaykh al-Hind".
 Ashraf Ali Thanwi (1863–1943)
 Ubaidullah Sindhi (1863–1943) – Freedom fighter and Life Member of Jamia Millia Islamia.
 Anwar Shah Kashmiri (1875–1933)
 Hussain Ahmed Madani (1879–1957)
 Muhammad Ilyas al-Kandhlawi (1884–1944) – Founder of Tablighi Jamaat.
 Shabbir Ahmad Usmani (1887–1949)
 Uzair Gul Peshawari (1886–1989), Freedom Fighter and Former Head of Madrasa Rahmania in Roorkee.
 Muhammad Shafi Deobandi (1897–1976)
 Muhammad Zakariyya al-Kandhlawi (1898–1982)
 Zayn al-Abidin Sajjad Meerthi (1910–1991), Former Head of the Islamic studies department of Jamia Millia Islamia.
 Abdul Matin Chowdhury (1915–1990)
 Shah Ahmad Shafi (1916–2020), former Chief of Hefajat-e-Islam Bangladesh, rector of Al-Jamiatul Ahlia Darul Ulum Moinul Islam Hathazari and also the chairman of Bangladesh Qawmi Madrasah Education Board.
 Abdur Rahman Bangladeshi (1920–2015) – He was the founder director of Islamic Research Center Bangladesh, Dhaka & Many Deobandi school. Ex chairman of the Shariah Council of Many Islamic Bank.
 Muhammad Abdul Wahhab (1923–2018) – former (Amir of Tablighi Jamaat Pakistan Chapter).
 Nur Uddin Gohorpuri (1924–2005)
 Khalid Mahmood (1925–2020) – UK. He was the founder and Director of The Islamic Academy of Manchester. which was established in 1974. He served formerly as a Professor at Murray College Sialkot and also at MAO College Lahore. He obtained a PhD in Comparative Religion from University of Birmingham in 1970. He has authored over 50 books, and has served as the Justice of Supreme court of Pakistan (Shariat Appellate Bench).
 Muhammad Yunus Jownpuri (1937-2017) - Senior Hadith Scholar and former Shaykh al-Hadith of Mazahir Uloom, Saharanpur. He was among the senior students and disciples of Muhammad Zakariyya al-Kandhlawi.
 Usman Mansoorpuri (1944-2021) – First National President of Jamiat Ulama-e-Hind's Mahmood faction.
 Yusuf Motala (1946–2019) – UK; Founder and senior lecturer at Dar al-Ulum Bury, one of the oldest Deobandi Madrasas in the West; "He is a scholar's scholar – many of the United Kingdom's young Deobandi scholars have studied under his patronage."
 Nur Hossain Kasemi (1945–2020) – Former Secretary General of Hefazat-e-Islam Bangladesh.
 Ebrahim Desai, South Africa – Mufti and founder of Askimam fatwa portal.

Contemporary Deobandis
 A F M Khalid Hossain – Bangladesh.
 Abdul Halim Bukhari, Bangladesh – Chancellor of Al Jamia Al Islamia Patiya
 Junaid Babunagari, Bangladeshi Islamic Scholar, He is serving as the assistant director of Al-Jamiatul Ahlia Darul Ulum Moinul Islam Hathazari, and secretary general of Hefajat-e-Islam Bangladesh.
 Mahmudul Hasan, Bangladesh – President of Al-Haiatul Ulya Lil-Jamiatil Qawmia Bangladesh and Befaqul Madarisil Arabia Bangladesh, Chancellor of Jamia Islamia Darul Uloom Madania, Amir of Majlis-e-Dawatul Haq Bangladesh.
 Mamunul Haque – Secretary General of Bangladesh Khelafat Majlish and President of Bangladesh Khelafat Youth Majlish.
 Muhibbullah Babunagari, Chief advisor of Hefazat-e-Islam Bangladesh (born 1935)
 Muhammad Rafi Usmani, Pakistan – Former President and senior lecturer of Darul Uloom Karachi.
 Muhammad Taqi Usmani, Pakistan – Vice-president of Dar al-Ulum Karachi, Former judge on the Shariah Appellate Bench of the Supreme Court of Pakistan, Deputy Chairman of the Islamic Fiqh Academy of the OIC, leading scholar of Islamic Finance, and often considered to be a leading scholar and figurehead of the Deobandi movement.
 Nurul Islam Jihadi, Secretary General of Hefazat-e-Islam Bangladesh. (born 1948)
 Allama Nurul Islam Olipuri – Mufassir from Bangladesh.
 Tariq Jameel, Pakistan – Prominent scholar and preacher from the Tablighi Jama'at.
 Ismail ibn Musa Menk, Zimbabwean scholar.
 Tariq Masood, Pakistani author and scholar.
 Taha Karaan, late South African scholar and jurist (d.2021).
 Abdur Rahman ibn Yusuf Mangera, Mufti and founder of Whitethread Institute and Zamzam Academy.
 Muhammad Sufyan Qasmi, current rector of Darul Uloom Waqf, Deoband.
 Rahmatullah Mir Qasmi, founder and rector of Darul Uloom Raheemiyyah.
 Mahfuzul Haque, secretary general of Befaqul Madarisil Arabia Bangladesh.
 Muhammad ibn Adam Al-Kawthari, founder and chief-Mufti of Darul Ifta Leicester.
 Abdolhamid Ismaeelzahi, Iraninan Sunni Scholar who is regarded as a "spiritual leader for Iran’s Sunni Muslim population".
 Yasir Nadeem al Wajidi, Chicago-based Indian Scholar and the founder of Darul Uloom Online.

Legacy 

 Islamic Revival in British India: Deoband, 1860-1900
 Revival from Below: The Deoband Movement and Global Islam
 The Deoband School And The Demand For Pakistan

See also 
 Index of Deobandi movement–related articles

References

General citations

Bibliography
 

Deobandi movement
Hanafis
Maturidis
Islam in India
Islam in Pakistan
Sunni Islamic movements
Sunni Islamic branches
1866 establishments in India